John Moreland (born June 19, 1965) is an American entrepreneur, venture capitalist. He is the founder of Avetta, an online supplier management marketplace and president of Operation Underground Railroad.

Early life 

Moreland was born in Fullerton, California and raised in Irvine, California. After his parents divorced, Moreland lived with his mother and his sister.

Moreland became a police officer and spent most of his career as a canine handler. Moreland's longtime partner, Crambo, a veteran K-9 officer. During his tenure, Moreland experienced working the famous Rodney King riots of the early 1990s.

Career

Moreland formed the idea for Avetta while he was working as an occupational safety professional in the oil & gas industry. As Founder, Moreland established Avetta as a supplier compliance software firm.

Avetta’ rapid growth was spurred by clients in the chemical and oil & gas industries including BP, ExxonMobil, ConocoPhillips, BASF, and others. In 2015, Avetta was named one of the Top 20 Most Promising Supply Chain Solution Providers by CIO magazine.

Moreland had financial challenges with Avetta early on and eventually received $30,000 to help the company after taking second place in a business plan competition from Brigham Young University in 2005. He otherwise bootstrapped the company before raising venture capital — $35 million in a Series A investment from Norwest Venture Partners in December 2012 and a Series B round of $30 million in February 2015. At that time, Avetta had been operating in over 100 countries around the world.

Moreland is also a part owner and board member of STAJets.

In 2016, Moreland join Operation Underground Railroad (O.U.R.), in bringing an end to child kidnapping and slavery. Currently serving as President.

In 2018, Welsh, Carson, Anderson & Stowe (WCAS), acquired a majority equity interest in Avetta. Jon Kossow, Managing Partner at Norwest, said, "This is a fantastic outcome for Avetta's founders, management team and shareholders. The Company's technology platform, product roadmap and huge greenfield market opportunity suggest a future that's just as bright for all parties involved."

In 2016,  Moreland was selected as Supply & Demand Chain Executive Pros to Know Recipient.

References 

American venture capitalists
Living people
American police officers
1965 births
People from Fullerton, California
People from Irvine, California